Claret is a surname. Notable people with the surname include:

Arcadie Claret (1826–1897), mistress of King Leopold I of Belgium
Antonio María Claret y Clará (St. Anthony Mary Claret), 19th-century Spanish Roman Catholic archbishop.
Chantal Claret (born 1982), lead singer for the power pop band Morningwood
Emmanuelle Claret (1968–2013), French biathlete
Julia Clarete (born 1979), Filipino actress-singer